The Esso Golden Tournament was a golf tournament on the British PGA circuit from 1961 to 1967. It was played in a round-robin format at the Moor Park Golf Club in Rickmansworth, Hertfordshire, England. The event was sponsored by Esso, and was cancelled in 1968 when they terminated their sponsorship following disagreements with the PGA.

There were 15 competitors in each tournament who played each of the other 14 in an 18-hole match play contest. Most matches were played as a three-ball with three players playing a match against one another, each player playing two distinct matches. Some matches were played as ordinary singles match play. Two points were awarded for each match won while halved matches earned one point.

Prize money for each tournament was £5,700. Players received £20 for each point won, a total of £4,200 for the 210 matches. In addition, the first four in the final table received prize money of £750, £400, £250 and £100.

A similar round-robin tournament, the Penfold Professional Golf League, was played in 1938 and 1939, while the Goodall Palm Beach Round Robin, was played on the PGA Tour from 1938 to 1957. Round-robin tournaments became popular at this time with the Royal Gold Tournament contested in 1962 and Hennessy Round-robin Tournament being played in 1964.

Winners

The winner's share includes £20 won for each point.

References

External links
Results on where2golf.com

Golf tournaments in England